Lisa Norling is a U.S. historian noted for her pioneering work on gender and the sea. As such she is part of a new move in maritime historiography to examine gender, race and class in relation to seafaring labor, passengers and people in port cities (i.e. interfaces with the sea).

Life
She graduated from Cornell University, magna cum laude, and from Rutgers University with a Ph.D.
She teaches at the University of Minnesota.  She also teaches at the Frank C. Munson Institute of American Maritime Studies at Mystic Seaport, and serves as a consultant to the USS Constitution Museum.

She became involved in the Minnesota "Profile of Learning" controversy.

In 1994, she married Steven Ruggles, another historian. She currently lives in Minneapolis with her two children and her husband.

Awards
 2001 Frederick Jackson Turner Award
 2000 John Lyman Book Awards for best book in American Maritime History, North American Society for Oceanic History

Works

References

American women historians
American maritime historians
Cornell University alumni
Rutgers University alumni
University of Minnesota faculty
Living people
Year of birth missing (living people)
Frank C. Munson Institute of American Maritime History faculty
20th-century American historians
20th-century American women writers
21st-century American historians
21st-century American women writers